William Roberts Holt (born 31 May 1935) is a former New Zealand cricketer, who played two first-class cricket matches for Northern Districts in the 1964–65 season. A right-arm medium pace bowler, Holt took four wickets at 35.00, and scored 37 runs with the bat at 18.50. He also played ten matches for Northland in the Hawke Cup.

Life and career
Holt was born in Whangarei, Northland. He played his first cricket match for Northland against Waikato as part of the 1962/63 Hawke Cup on 24 November 1962. When Northland played the touring Pakistani national team on 26 December 1964, Holt took the wicket of Mohammad Ilyas from his 22 overs, conceding 54 runs. With the bat, batting at number nine, he scored nine and 36 as Northland were forced to follow on, and were eventually defeated by ten wickets.

On 4 January 1965 Holt played for Northland against Poverty Bay, taking a career-best 6/80 from his 35 overs. He then faced Pakistan on 4 February 1965 playing for Northern Districts in Hamilton. He took the wickets of Abdul Kadir and the final wicket of Afaq Hussain, from his 16.3 overs, conceding 42 runs. Pakistan were forced to follow on, Holt bowling nine more overs for 21 runs before the match ended as a draw. Two days later, Holt played his second and last match for the Northern Districts, against Canterbury in the Plunket Shield. Canterbury batted first, Holt bowling 21 overs, taking 2/77. He was then run out for 32. Northern Districts were forced to follow on, however the match ended as a draw before Holt batted again.

Holt returned to Northland for a match of the Hawke Cup on 27 March 1965 against Bay of Plenty. Holt took 2/48 and scored 25*.

References

External links
 

1935 births
Living people
New Zealand cricketers
Northern Districts cricketers
Cricketers from Whangārei